Eugene "Goo" Kennedy (August 23, 1949December 8, 2020) was an American professional basketball player.

A 6'7" forward/center, Kennedy played one season (1970–71) of college basketball at Texas Christian University, and was named the Southwest Conference Player of the Year after leading the TCU Horned Frogs to the conference championship. He averaged 16.6 rebounds per game that season, with a high of 28 versus the University of Arkansas.

After college, Kennedy played four seasons in the American Basketball Association as a member of the Dallas Chaparrals/San Antonio Spurs, Spirits of St. Louis, and Utah Stars. He then played one season in the National Basketball Association with the Houston Rockets. He averaged 8.2 points and 5.6 rebounds per game during his professional career.

Kennedy and his wife, Mary, raised over forty foster children over the years.

Kennedy died at age 71 on 8 December 2020, according to his daughter Eugenia. The cause of death was not immediately known.

References

1949 births
2020 deaths
American men's basketball players
Basketball players from Charlotte, North Carolina
Centers (basketball)
Dallas Chaparrals players
Houston Rockets players
Junior college men's basketball players in the United States
Power forwards (basketball)
San Antonio Spurs players
Spirits of St. Louis players
TCU Horned Frogs men's basketball players
Utah Stars players